is a Japanese gravure idol, tarento, and sportscaster represented by Asai Kikaku.

Filmography

TV series

Variety and informative programs

Dramas

Radio series

Internet

Programs

Articles

E-books

Game apps

References

External links
 
Tokyo Lucci profile 

Japanese idols
Japanese television personalities
1996 births
Living people
People from Tokyo